The Lemon Pipers were a short-lived 1960s American rock band from Oxford, Ohio, United States, known chiefly for their song "Green Tambourine", which reached No. 1 in the United States in 1968. The song has been credited as being the first bubblegum pop chart-topper.

The Lemon Pipers comprised drummer William (Bill) E. Albaugh (1946–1999), guitarist Bill Bartlett (fr) (born 1943), vocalist Dale "Ivan" Browne (born 1945), keyboardist Robert G. Nave (1944–2020), and bassist Steve Walmsley (born 1948), who replaced the original bass guitarist Bob "Dude" Dudek.

Career
The band was formed in 1966 by student musicians from Oxford, Ohio, who had played the college bars with their previous groups that included The Wombats (Nave), Ivan and the Sabres (Browne), and Tony and the Bandits (Bartlett, Albaugh and Dudek). The band played a mixture of blues, hard rock and folk rock, with a few covers from The Byrds and The Who. They gigged regularly in an Oxford bar called The Boar's Head, and Cincinnati underground rock venues, The Mug Club and later The Ludlow Garage, before releasing a single on the Carol Records label, "Quiet Please". The original band existed as a quartet, and then gained notoriety by reaching the finals in the Ohio Battle of the Bands at the Cleveland Public Auditorium in 1967, losing out to the James Gang.

Signing a record deal
The band then recruited Miami University student Browne as frontman, and also engaged Ohio music industry impresario Mark Barger, who steered the Lemon Pipers to Buddah Records, then run by Neil Bogart. The Lemon Pipers, relying in part on advice from Barger, agreed to enter into a recording contract and music publishing deal with Buddah. The group began playing larger auditorium and concert hall venues around the US, including an appearance at Bill Graham's Fillmore West in San Francisco on the same bill with Traffic, Moby Grape and Spirit on March 21, 1968. Buddah's plans for the group focused on bubblegum pop rather than rock music, and the Lemon Pipers joined a stable already containing Ohio Express and the aptly named 1910 Fruitgum Company. Paul Leka was assigned to be their record producer.

Number one hit
The group's debut on Buddah was a Bartlett composition, "Turn Around and Take a Look". When the song failed to make the charts, the label asked Leka and his songwriting partner, Shelley Pinz, who were working out of a Brill Building office on Broadway, to come up with a song. The pair wrote "Green Tambourine" and the band reluctantly recorded it. The song entered the Billboard Hot 100 at the end of 1967 and reached No. 1 in February 1968 on the Billboard and Cashbox charts. The song peaked at No. 7 in the UK Singles Chart, and was also a hit worldwide. It sold over two million copies, and was awarded a gold disc by the Recording Industry Association of America (R.I.A.A.) in February 1968.
 
The success of "Green Tambourine" caused the label to put pressure on the group to stay in the same genre, and in March 1968 the band released another Leka/Pinz song, "Rice Is Nice", which peaked at No. 46 on the US Billboard charts, No.42 on the US Cashbox charts and No. 41 in the UK in May. The band had little enthusiasm for either song, however, dubbing them "funny-money music" and recording them only because they knew they would be dropped by Buddah if they refused. "Ordinary Point of View", written by Eric Ehrmann and featuring a Bartlett country solo, was recorded, but rejected by Buddah. Disenchanted with Buddah and the music industry, Ehrmann stopped writing songs and went on to become one of the early contributors to Rolling Stone magazine. As is common with the music associated with the 1960s, a few copyright and royalties issues connected with the previous owner of Buddah Records inherited by current owners of the Kama Sutra music publishing catalog and Lemon Pipers songs remain unresolved.

Stereotyped
The Lemon Pipers' evolution from 1960s rock music into a gold-record pop group created what Nave has described as "the duality of the Lemon Pipers": "We were a stand-up rock 'n' roll band, and then all of a sudden, we're in a studio, being told how to play and what to play."
 
The chasm between the label's aspirations and the band's own musical tastes became apparent on the Lemon Pipers’ debut album, Green Tambourine. Produced by Leka, the album contained five Leka/Pinz songs, as well as two extended tracks written by the band, "Fifty Year Void" and "Through With You" (the latter, written by Bartlett, bearing influences of The Byrds and, according to the original LP label, running 8:31 in length). "Ask Me If I Care" written by Ehrmann, was also included. Like Lemon Pipers' members Nave and Albaugh, Ehrmann was a member of the Kappa chapter of Delta Kappa Epsilon fraternity. Writing in Bubblegum is the Naked Truth, Gary Pig Gold commented: "It was the Pipers’ way with a tough-pop gem in the under-four-minute category which was most impressive by far: "Rainbow Tree", "Shoeshine Boy" and especially "Blueberry Blue" each sported a taut, musical sophistication worthy of The Move and, dare I say it, even the Magical Mystery Beatles."

The band recorded a second album for Buddah, Jungle Marmalade, which again showed both sides of the band – another Leka/Pinz song, "Jelly Jungle (of Orange Marmalade", (released as a single and peaking at No. 51 on Billboard and No. 30 on Cashbox in the US), a version of the Carole King/Gerry Goffin penned song "I Was Not Born to Follow," and an 11-minute, 43 second epic, "Dead End Street"/"Half Light".

Dissolution
The band left the Buddah label in 1969 and later dissolved. Bartlett, Walmsley and Nave formed Starstruck, whose recording of a Lead Belly song, "Black Betty", was reworked by Super K Productions producers Jerry Kasenetz and Jeffry Katz, and released in 1977 under the name of Ram Jam, featuring Bartlett. Browne moved to California to continue playing music, Walmsley played bass around Oxford. Bartlett became despondent and reclusive following the death of his wife Dee Dee. Nave became a jazz disc jockey on WVXU in Cincinnati and played organ occasionally with The Blues Merchants in southwestern Ohio venues.

Drummer Bill Albaugh died on January 20, 1999, at the age of 53.

Keyboardist Bob Nave (born Robert Gordon Nave on November 3, 1944 in Dayton, Ohio) died on January 28, 2020, at the age of 75.

Members
Timeline

Discography

Studio albums

Compilation albums
 Best of the Lemon Pipers (Camden/BMG, 1998)
 Green Tambourine: The Best of the Lemon Pipers (Buddha 99798, 2001)

Singles

See also
List of artists who reached number one in the United States
List of 1960s one-hit wonders in the United States

Notes

References

External links

 [ Allmusic overview]
 
  Rick Kennedy, "Off the Charts", Cincinnati Magazine, May 11, 2012, including interviews with band members.
 Classicwebs (archive)
 Home.comcast.net

American pop music groups
Musical groups established in 1966
Musical groups disestablished in 1969
1966 establishments in Ohio
Psychedelic pop music groups
Musical groups from Ohio